Aarberg railway station is a railway station in the municipality of Aarberg, in the Swiss canton of Bern. It is an intermediate stop on the standard gauge Palézieux–Lyss railway line of Swiss Federal Railways.

Services 
The following services stop at Aarberg:

Gallery

References

External links 
 
 

Railway stations in the canton of Bern
Swiss Federal Railways stations